Kent is a ghost town in Reno County, Kansas, United States.  It was located 7 miles southeast of Hutchinson at the intersection of Kent Road and the Atchison, Topeka and Santa Fe Railway.  It is the site of a former post office; and a former station on the ATSF Railway (the station was the site of a locomotive change on the Scott Special).

References

Further reading

External links
 Reno County maps: Current, Historic, KDOT

Ghost towns in Kansas
Unincorporated communities in Reno County, Kansas
Unincorporated communities in Kansas